Elizabeth, Princess Berkeley, sometimes unofficially styled Margravine of Brandenburg-Ansbach (née Lady Elizabeth Berkeley; —), previously Elizabeth Craven, Baroness Craven, of Hamstead Marshall, was an author and playwright, perhaps best known for her travelogues.

Life

Elizabeth Berkeley was born in Mayfair, London, the third child of the Augustus Berkeley, 4th Earl of Berkeley and his wife, Elizabeth Drax, daughter of Henry Drax and Elizabeth Ernle.

Biography 
After thirteen years of marriage, seven children, and affairs reported on both sides, the couple parted permanently in 1780. She had an affair with Charles Greville sometime in late 1783.  

Thereafter she lived in France and traveled extensively on the Continent.

For a number of years she maintained a romantic relationship with Charles Alexander, Margrave of Brandenburg-Ansbach. During her years at the Ansbach court, Craven formed an amateur theatre at court, which counted the composer Maria Theresia von Ahlefeldt among its members.

While the Margravine was snubbed by ladies mindful of their reputations, as well as by her new husband's cousin, King George III, and by Queen Marie-Antoinette when she visited France, the couple lived a full and opulent life in Hammersmith, London, and Benham Park at Speen in Berkshire.

In fact, Charles Alexander, being the last of his cadet branch of the House of Hohenzollern, and childless, had exchanged his hereditary birthright to the appanages of Ansbach and Bayreuth for an annuity of 300,000 guilders from his pater familias, King Frederick William II of Prussia, a month after his second marriage. In England, however, the couple were usually known as the "Margrave and Margravine of Brandenburg-Ansbach".

After Charles Alexander's death at Benham Park in 1806, Craven moved to Naples.  She died at Craven Villa in Posillipo and was buried in 1828 in the English Cemetery at Naples. Her links with the Hammersmith area are commemorated in the names of two roads in the area – Margravine Gardens and Margravine Road. There is a wall monument by Roubiliac to her in St Mary's Church, Scarborough.

Her children were:
 William, a Major-general in the Army
 Henry Augustus Berkeley (b. 1776), also a Major-general in the Army
 Keppel Richard (b. 1779)
 Elizabeth, who married John Edward Maddocks
 Maria Margaret, who married William Molyneux, 2nd Earl of Sefton
 Georgiana
 Arabella, who married General the Hon. Frederick St John

Works
Early in her literary career she wrote a number of light farces, pantomimes, and fables, some of which were performed in London. She knew Samuel Johnson and James Boswell, and became a close friend of Horace Walpole, who published her early works.

Publications
 : this is one of the few of Craven's musical compositions to survive.
 : Translated from Le Somnambule, a comedy by Antoine de Ferriol de Pont-de-Veyle; Craven also wrote the prologue and epilogue.  
: translated from Giuseppe Parini's original Italian
 : published anonymously; went into four editions by 1781.
 : published anonymously; a new edition came out the following year after the play debuted professionally
 : published anonymously
 : there was a second edition, and an Irish edition, the same year
: this play was only translated into English in 2018

Performances
Most of Craven's plays were produced as private theatricals at Brandenburgh House at Fulham. Three of them were produced on the professional stage:
The Miniature Picture ran four nights at Drury Lane beginning Wednesday 24 May 1780.
The Silver Tankard; or, The Point at Portsmouth (with music by Craven, Tommaso Giordani, and Samuel Arnold) began a six-performance run at the Haymarket Theatre on Wednesday 18 July 1781.
The Princess of Georgia played at Covent Garden on Friday 19 April 1799.

Etexts
 
Modern anecdotes (1779): full text at Google Books
The Miniature Picture (1780): full text at Google Books
A journey through the Crimea (1789): full text at HathiTrust; full text at Google Books
Memoirs of the Margravine of Anspach (1826): full text at HathiTrust; full text at Google Books

Notes

Further reading 

Gasper, Julia. Elizabeth Craven: Georgian feminist. 3 January 2018. Accessed 28 August 2022.

External links

"Craven, Elizabeth." The Women's Print History Project, 2019, Person ID 1168. Accessed 2022-08-27.
Elizabeth Craven, Covey Author Page.
Elizabeth Craven at the Eighteenth-Century Poetry Archive (ECPA)

Lady Elizabeth Craven, Women’s Travel Writing, 1780–1840, British Travel Writing

1750 births
1828 deaths
Daughters of British earls
English baronesses
English dramatists and playwrights
People from Hammersmith
People from Speen, Berkshire
People from Westminster
British women dramatists and playwrights
18th-century British women writers
18th-century British writers
19th-century English women writers
19th-century English writers
19th-century British writers
British women travel writers
English classical composers
British women classical composers
English opera composers
English women singers
Elizabeth
Elizabeth
Margravines of Brandenburg-Ansbach
German princesses
Morganatic spouses of German royalty
British travel writers
Women opera composers